Patel Ki Punjabi Shaadi  is an Indian Hindi romantic comedy film, starring Rishi Kapoor, Paresh Rawal, Vir Das, Payal Ghosh and Prem Chopra. This film is directed by Sanjay Chhel and produced by Bharat Patel of Bholenath Movies. Rishi Kapoor and Paresh Rawal will be seen together for the first time in 20 years. The film which began production in 2014, and was released on 15 September 2017.

Plot
The story is about a Punjabi (Rishi Kapoor) and a Gujarati (Paresh Rawal) whose children are to marry each other. Payal Ghosh will debut as Paresh Rawal's daughter, who plays the love interest of Rishi Kapoor's son, to be played by Vir Das.

Cast
Rishi Kapoor as Guggi Tandon
Paresh Rawal as Hasmukh Patel
Bharati Achrekar as Hasmukh's mother
Daya Shankar Pandey as inspector Patil
Jinal Belani as Manisha Patel (Hasmukh's first daughter)
Payal Ghosh as Pooja Patel (Hasmukh's second daughter), Monty's wife 
Karanvir Bohra as Pankaj Patel or Pet Singh (Hasmukh's son)
Teejay Sidhu as Pankaj's wife
Divya Seth as Pummy Tandon (Guggi's wife)
Rachna Khanna as Pummy's sister
Vir Das as Monty Tondon (Guggi's son), Pooja's husband
Prem Chopra as Prem Lal Tandon (Guggi's father)     
Tiku Talsania as Kanti Bhai (as Manisha's father-in-law)
Dilip Joshi as Narrator 
Shilpa Shinde as Dancer (Item Song - "Maro Line")

Production
Production Manager Ganesh Vaghani
Still photography Ashvin Borad Surat. 
The film was shot in Mumbai and Surat. They also shoot scenes in the 200-year-old Forbes Gujarati Sabha library in Mumbai.Line producer Atul Patel & Ashvin Borad

Soundtrack

References

   6.https://timesofindia.indiatimes.com/entertainment/hindi/movie-reviews/patel-ki-punjabi-shaadi/movie-review/60527462.cms

   7.https://www.rottentomatoes.com/m/patel_ki_punjabi_shaadi

External links

 
 
  Patel Ki Punjabi Shaadi on MSN

2010s Hindi-language films
2017 films
Films about Indian weddings
Indian romantic comedy films
2017 romantic comedy films